The 1998 Belgian Supercup was a football match between the winners of the previous season's Belgian First Division and Belgian Cup competitions. The match was contested by Cup winners Genk, and 1997–98 Belgian First Division champions, Club Brugge on 8 August 1998 at the ground of the league winners Club Brugge, the Jan Breydel Stadium. Club Brugge won the match, holding on to their lead despite a late consolation goal by Souleymane Oularé.

Details

See also
1997–98 Belgian First Division
1997–98 Belgian Cup

Notes

References

Belgian Super Cup, 1998
Belgian Supercup
Belgian Super Cup 1998
K.R.C. Genk matches
August 1998 sports events in Europe